Smicraulax is a genus of true weevils in the beetle family Curculionidae. There are about six described species in Smicraulax.

Species
These six species belong to the genus Smicraulax:
 Smicraulax arizonicus Sleeper, 1954 i c b
 Smicraulax ephippiatus Anderson, 1997 c
 Smicraulax nigrinus Anderson, 1997 c
 Smicraulax otidocephaloides Anderson, 1997 c
 Smicraulax piercei Burke & Cross, 1975 c
 Smicraulax tuberculatus Pierce, 1908 i c
Data sources: i = ITIS, c = Catalogue of Life, g = GBIF, b = Bugguide.net

References

Further reading

External links

 

Curculioninae
Articles created by Qbugbot